MLV may refer to:

 The Roman numeral for 1055
 a number in the numbers number range
 the year AD 1055 CE

 M. L. Vasanthakumari (1928−1990; Madras Lalitangi Vasanthakumari), Indian singer
 Major League Volleyball, a women's professional volleyball league in the United States 1987−1989
 Mass-loaded vinyl, typically used for sound proofing/dampering.
 Medium-lift launch vehicle, a category of orbital rockets capable of lifting 2 to 20 tons to low Earth orbit
 Meningeal lymphatic vessels,  lymphatic vessels located in the Meninges
 Modern Literal Version, a modern literal translation of the Christian Bible
 Motor Luggage Van, British Rail Class 419 
 Multilamellar vesicle (biology and chemistry), a bubble of liquid with more than one phospholipid bilayer
 MultiLevel, Bombardier MultiLevel Coach
 Multi-layer varistor, a device providing electrostatic discharge protection to electronic circuits
 Multiple-language version, a film production strategy of making a single film in two or more different languages
 Murine leukemia virus, a retrovirus which causes cancer in mice

 Mwotlap language (ISO 639 langue code: mlv)
 Malvinas VOR-DME (beacon: MLV), at the Las Malvinas Airport
 Merluna Airport (IATA airport code: MLV); see List of airports in Australia
 Dutch Military Proficiency Badge (MLV)

See also

 1055 (disambiguation)
 M55 (disambiguation)

 MIV (disambiguation)